Saving Grace may refer to:

 Grace (Christianity), a concept in Christian soteriology
 Saving Grace (TV series), a 2007 television series starring Holly Hunter
 "Saving Grace" (short story), a 1990 short story by Orson Scott Card

Film
 Saving Grace (1986 film), a film based on a novel by Celia Gittelson
 Saving Grace (1998 film), a New Zealand film based on a play by Duncan Sarkies
 Saving Grace (2000 film), a British film
 Saving Grace (2008 film), a film based on a Connie Stevens screenplay

Music
 Saving Grace (band), a metal / hardcore band from New Zealand
Saving Grace, Robert Plant's band, formed in 2019.
 Saving Grace, former name of Canadian country music duo now known as One More Girl
 "Saving Grace" (song), a 2006 single by Tom Petty
 "Saving Grace", a song by Bob Dylan from Saved (1980)
 "Saving Grace", a song by Everlast
 "Saving Grace", a song by Christian female group Point of Grace
 "Saving Grace", a song by The Cranberries from Bury the Hatchet (1999)
 "Saving Grace", a song by The Pretenders from the album Loose Screw (2002)
 "Saving Grace", a song by The Maine from the album Black & White